Pseudocatharylla duplicellus is a moth in the family Crambidae. It was described by George Hampson in 1896. It is found in Vietnam, Taiwan, Japan, China (Jiangsu, Zhejiang, Tongling), Malaysia and Sri Lanka.

References

Crambinae
Moths described in 1896